Nicolas De Santis (born November 11, 1967) is a former professional soccer player.

Club career
After beginning his pro career in 1987 with the Montreal Supra of the Canadian Soccer League, he signed for the Montreal Impact in 1993 where he helped the Impact win the league championship in 1994. He earned titles in 1995, 1996 and 1997. He retired as a player following the 2003 season, was second in Impact history for games played (219), as well as fourth for goals scored (21). He also had short spells in the US and Italy. De Santis had a stint in the National Professional Soccer League with the short lived expansion franchise the Toronto ThunderHawks during the 2000-2001 winter indoor season. He helped the ThunderHawks reach the postseason by finishing second in the National Conference, and reached the Conference finals where they were defeated by the Milwaukee Wave.

International career
De Santis represented Canada at the 1987 Pan American Games and 1987 FIFA World Youth Championship. He made his senior debut for Canada in a March 1988 friendly match against Peru, in which he immediately scored his first (and only) goal. He went on to earn 11 caps. His final international was an October 1997 FIFA World Cup qualification match against Mexico.

He also participated in the inaugural 1989 Futsal World Cup in the Netherlands.

International goals
Scores and results list Canada's goal tally first.

Managerial career
After his retirement he succeeded Bob Lilley as the new head coach of the Montreal Impact. In his first season as head coach he won the Montreals second League Championship beating Seattle Sounders 2–0. In his second season as coach he led the team to a record of 18-3-7 and to its fourth regular-season championship, he established a new league record by going undefeated in 15 consecutive games (10-0-5). Montreal also went undefeated for nine straight games on the road (6-0-3), a new club record. He also established a new club record for fewest losses in a season. Though the Impact lost in the playoffs, He was named Coach of the Year in the USL First Division.

In 2006 his third season as head coach he helped the Impact win their fifth regular-season championship, but the Impact were knocked out in the semi-final of the playoffs against the Vancouver Whitecaps in a 2–0 defeat. He also guided the team to its best start to the season at home, with a 10-game undefeated streak, as well collect 10 shutouts at home which tied a club record. And allow only four goals at home, a new club record that erases the old mark of six set in 1994 and was tied in 1996 and 2004.

After a poor record to start the 2008 season, De Santis stepped down as head coach of the Impact and was replaced by John Limniatis on June 13, 2008.

Honours
 APSL Championship: 1
 1994
 USL First Division Championship: 1
 1994
 USL First Division Regular Season Championship: 3
 1995, 1996, 1997
 Voyageurs Cup: 2
 2002, 2003

Career statistics

Last Update: June 22, 2009

Managerial statistics

References

External links
 Nick DeSantis at Montreal Impact
 
 

1967 births
Living people
Soccer players from Montreal
Canadian people of Italian descent
Association football midfielders
Canadian soccer players
Footballers at the 1987 Pan American Games
Pan American Games competitors for Canada
Canada men's youth international soccer players
Canada men's international soccer players
Canadian expatriate soccer players
Canadian expatriate sportspeople in Italy
Canadian expatriate sportspeople in the United States
Montreal Supra players
Montreal Impact (1992–2011) players
Kansas City Attack (NPSL) players
Chicago Power (NPSL) players
Edmonton Drillers (1996–2000) players
Raleigh (Capital) Express players
Canadian Soccer League (1987–1992) players
American Professional Soccer League players
A-League (1995–2004) players
Expatriate footballers in Italy
Expatriate soccer players in the United States
Canadian soccer coaches
Montreal Impact (1992–2011) coaches
USL First Division coaches
North American Soccer League coaches
Toronto ThunderHawks players
National Professional Soccer League (1984–2001) players
A.S.D. Termoli Calcio 1920 players
CF Montréal non-playing staff